Hypancistrus margaritatus is a species of catfish in the family Loricariidae. It is native to South America, where it occurs in the Takutu River of Guyana, which is a tributary of the Branco River, which is in turn a tributary of the Rio Negro in the Amazon basin. The species reaches 4.6 cm (1.8 inches) SL. Its specific epithet means "adorned with pearls" in Latin, referring to its distinctive pearl-like white spots. It was described in 2016 by Milton Tan and Jonathan W. Armbruster on the basis of coloration, alongside the related species Hypancistrus phantasma.

This species appears in the aquarium trade, where it is most frequently referred to by its L-number, which is L-404.

References 

Ancistrini
Fish described in 2016